Emerald Sea may refer to:

Arts and entertainment
 Emerald Sea, an 1878 painting by Albert Bierstadt
 Emerald Sea, a 2004 novel by John Ringo in the series The Council Wars
 The Emerald Sea, a 2018 novel by Richelle Mead
 "The Emerald Sea", from the Anodyne video game soundtrack
 "The Emerald Sea", from the Narcissu video game soundtrack
 "The Emerald Sea", a song by Gary Hughes from the 2007 album Veritas

Ships
 Emerald Seas, built as 
 Emerald Sea, owned by McDermott International
 Emerald Sea, an SA-15 type cargo ship

Other uses
 Emerald Sea, the internal development code name for Google+ 
  ('Emerald Sea'), a lagoon in Madagascar

See also
 Emerald (disambiguation)
 Sea emerald